was a Japanese film director and screenwriter.

Career
Born in Hyōgo Prefecture, Urayama graduated from Nagoya University before joining the Nikkatsu studio in 1954. After working as an assistant director to Yūzō Kawashima and Shohei Imamura, he debuted as a director with Foundry Town in 1962, a film that depicted the life of Zainichi Korean residents of Japan. He won the Directors Guild of Japan New Directors Award for that film. His 1963 film Bad Girl (Each day I cry) was entered into the 3rd Moscow International Film Festival where it won a Golden Prize.

He directed a total of nine films before his untimely death in 1985.

Selected filmography
 Victory Is Mine (1956, writer)
 Foundry Town (1962, director and writer)
 Bad Girl (1963)
 The Gate of Youth (1975, director and writer)
 Taro the Dragon Boy (1979, director and screenplay)

References

External links

1930 births
1985 deaths
Japanese film directors
People from Hyōgo Prefecture
Nagoya University alumni
20th-century Japanese screenwriters